Marko Lelov (born 21 November 1973) is an Estonian football manager and former professional player.

Lelov played as a midfielder for Pärnu Kalakombinaat/MEK, Tervis Pärnu, Flora, Lelle, Tulevik, Nyköpings BIS and Vimmerby IF, and made three appearances for the Estonia national team.

International career
Lelov made his debut for Estonia on 29 July 1994, in a 0–3 loss against Lithuania in a 1994 Baltic Cup match.

References

External links

1973 births
Living people
Sportspeople from Pärnu
Estonian footballers
Association football midfielders
Estonia international footballers
Estonian football managers
FC Flora players
Meistriliiga players
Viljandi JK Tulevik players
Esiliiga players
Nyköpings BIS players
Vimmerby IF players
Viljandi JK Tulevik managers
FC Flora managers
JK Tervis Pärnu players
Pärnu JK Vaprus managers